Louis E. Schwend (1875 – November 24, 1900) was an architect in North Carolina at the firm of Hayden, Wheeler, and Schwend. He designed the Iredell County Courthouse (1899), prototype for a series of similar courthouse designs executed by the successor firms of Oliver Duke Wheeler and his partners.

Schwend was born in Cincinnati, Ohio to Max Schwend, a lithographer from Saxony, and Mary Schwend of New York. Oliver D. Wheeler and Luke Hayden moved their office from Atlanta to Charlotte and brought Schwend on as a partner in 1899. He returned to Cincinnati and died of heart disease on November 24, 1900. He is buried in Spring Grove Cemetery in a lot owned by his grandmother, Adelheid Hessinger.

References

1875 births
1900 deaths
19th-century American architects